Sclerococcus is a weevil genus in the tribe Tropiphorini.

References

External links 

 animaldiversity.ummz.umich.edu
 

Entiminae